Chrysophyllum eximium is a tree in the family Sapotaceae, native to tropical South America.

Description
Fascicles feature up to 10 greenish-white flowers.

Distribution and habitat
Chrysophyllum eximium is native to Suriname and northern Brazil. Its habitat is in swamp forest and other areas subject to flooding.

References

eximium
Flora of North Brazil
Flora of Suriname
Plants described in 1932
Taxa named by Adolpho Ducke